Echinoscelis pandani is a species of moth in the family Cosmopterigidae. It is found in Australia.

References

External links
Natural History Museum Lepidoptera genus database

Cosmopteriginae